John Strode (1524 – 2 September 1581), the son of Robert Strode of Parnham, Dorset and Elizabeth Hody, was elected MP for Dorset in 1572 and was Sheriff of Dorset from 1572 to 1573.

Life
Born in 1524, John Strode was the eldest son of Robert Strode (d. 1559) of Parnham and Elizabeth, daughter of Reginald Hody.

He served as captain of musters by 1560, commissioner of concealed lands and Sheriff of Dorset from 1572 to 1573 and Justice of the Peace from about 1575.

In his later years he investigated taverns and grain supplies at Lyme Regis; entertained the 2nd Earl of Bedford at Bridport; stayed at Marshwood with Sir Amias Paulet, the lord of the manor; investigated horse theft; and, in 1578, investigated at the request of the Privy Council the causes of the dispute between Sir Henry Ashley and Henry Howard, son of Thomas Howard, 1st Viscount Howard of Bindon. The Privy Council praised him for his "great travail" in 1580, when he and others had been examining the recusant, Lady Tregonwell, the widow of Sir John Tregonwell (d. 1565).

He died 2 September 1581, leaving £1,400 to his children, and appointing Henry Coker overseer. His eldest son Robert, then aged about 22, was executor and residuary legatee.

Marriages and issue
Strode married twice. He married firstly, Katherine, daughter of Gregory Cromwell, 1st Baron Cromwell and Elizabeth Seymour, by whom he had six children:
 Robert Strode (1559 – )
 Edward Strode
 Sir John Strode
 Thomas Strode
 George Strode
 Margaret Strode

He married secondly, on 28 January 1572, Margaret, daughter of Christopher (or Christian) Hadley of Withycombe, Somerset and widow of Thomas Luttrell by whom he had one son and five daughters:
 Hugh Strode
 Margaret Strode
 Anne Strode
 Dorothy Strode
 Bridget Strode
 Alice Strode

Notes

References

External links
 Hasler, P.W. (1981). "Strode, John (1524-81), of Parnham, Dorset". In Hasler, P.W. (ed.). The History of Parliament: the House of Commons 1558–1603. at historyofparliamentonline.org

1524 births
1581 deaths
Politicians from Dorset
English MPs 1572–1583
Place of death missing